Francis Siguenza (born 30 November 1930) is a French former professional racing cyclist. He rode in four editions of the Tour de France.

References

External links
 

1930 births
Living people
French male cyclists
Sportspeople from Nîmes
Cyclists from Occitania (administrative region)